Trichaptum is a genus of poroid fungi. The genus was circumscribed by American mycologist William Alphonso Murrill in 1904. Formerly classified in the family Polyporaceae, several molecular studies have shown that the genus belongs to the order Hymenochaetales.

Species
Trichaptum abietinum
Trichaptum agglutinatum
Trichaptum album
Trichaptum basifuscum
Trichaptum biforme
Trichaptum brastagii
Trichaptum bulbocystidiatum
Trichaptum byssogenum
Trichaptum ceraceicutis
Trichaptum deviatum
Trichaptum favoloides
Trichaptum flavum
Trichaptum fumosoavellaneum
Trichaptum fuscoviolaceum
Trichaptum griseofuscum
Trichaptum imbricatum
Trichaptum jackiae
Trichaptum lacunosum
Trichaptum laricinum
Trichaptum molestum
Trichaptum montanum
Trichaptum parvulum
Trichaptum perenne
Trichaptum perpusillum
Trichaptum perrottetii
Trichaptum podocarpi
Trichaptum polycystidiatum
Trichaptum sector
Trichaptum strigosum
Trichaptum subchartaceum
Trichaptum suberosum
Trichaptum trichomallum
Trichaptum variabilis
Trichaptum vinaceobrunneum

References

Hymenochaetales
Taxa named by William Alphonso Murrill
Agaricomycetes genera